

136001–136100 

|-bgcolor=#f2f2f2
| colspan=4 align=center | 
|}

136101–136200 

|-id=108
| 136108 Haumea ||  || Haumea, Hawaiian goddess of childbirth and fertility, a personification of stone, and two of her daughters, Hiʻiaka and Namaka (Src) || 
|-id=197
| 136197 Johnandrews ||  || John P. Andrews (born 1963) is a research and development director for Southwest Research Institute in Boulder, Colorado. He served as the Project Manager for the New Horizons mission to Pluto. || 
|-id=199
| 136199 Eris ||  || Eris, from Greek mythology, the goddess of discord and strife. The dwarf planet's moon, (136199) Eris I Dysnomia, is named after her daughter (Src). || 
|}

136201–136300 

|-id=273
| 136273 Csermely ||  || Péter Csermely (born 1958) is a Hungarian biochemist, and network researcher. His major fields of study are the adaptation and learning of complex networks. In 1995 he launched a highly successful initiative, which provided research opportunities for more than 10 \, 000 gifted high school students. || 
|}

136301–136400 

|-id=367
| 136367 Gierlinger ||  || Richard Gierlinger (born 1967), an Austrian amateur astronomer, telescope builder and discoverer of minor planets || 
|}

136401–136500 

|-id=432
| 136432 Allenlunsford ||  || Allen Lunsford (born 1968) is the Visible and near InfraRed Spectrometer (OVIRS) algorithm lead, developing all instrument operation and calibration software, as well as testing for the OSIRIS-REx asteroid sample-return mission || 
|-id=472
| 136472 Makemake ||  || Makemake, creator deity of the Rapa Nui mythology (Easter Island). The discovery team previously used the codename "Easterbunny" for this object (Src). || 
|-id=473
| 136473 Bakosgáspár || 2005 GB ||  (born 1976), Hungarian astrophysicist and father of HATNet, a network of telescopes that detects extrasolar planets and variable stars || 
|}

136501–136600 

|-id=518
| 136518 Opitz ||  || Nándor Opitz (1922–1995), a Hungarian engineer, aviator and the first Hungarian FAI Diamond Badge glider pilot. || 
|-id=557
| 136557 Neleus || 5214 T-2 || Neleus, husband to Chloris and father of the Greek Nestor, banished with his other children to Messina and later killed by Heracles || 
|}

136601–136700 

|-id=666
| 136666 Seidel || 1995 SE || Josef Seidel (1859–1935), and his son Frantíšek Seidel (1908–1997), photographers from Český Krumlov in the Czech Republic. Their work depicts both people and places of the southeast part of the Bohemian Forest (Šumava). || 
|}

136701–136800 

|-id=743
| 136743 Echigo ||  || Echigo, a name of an old administrative area in Japan. || 
|-id=795
| 136795 Tatsunokingo || 1997 BQ || Tatsuno Kingo (1854–1919) was a Japanese architect, born in Karatsu, Saga Prefecture. He was a leading Japanese modern architect, and he taught many students. He was best known as the designer of the Bank of Japan building (Tokyo) and Tokyo railway station. || 
|}

136801–136900 

|-id=803
| 136803 Calliemorgan ||  || Callie Morgan Caruso (born 2009), granddaughter of American astronomer Jim Bruton who discovered this minor planet || 
|-id=818
| 136818 Selqet ||  || Selqet, ancient Egyptian goddess of magic, protector of the other gods from the destroyer, Apep || 
|-id=824
| 136824 Nonamikeiko ||  || Keiko Nonami (born 1960), member of Matsue Astronomy Club || 
|-id=825
| 136825 Slawitschek ||  || Rudolf Slawitschek (1880–1945) was a Prague-based German writer and jurist. He wrote the historical novel Hans Adam Löwenmacht (Pražský dobrodruh), the children's book Anastasius Katzenschlucker and Der blaue Herrgott (1927), which takes place in the landscape of Kleť Mountain and nearby Český Krumlov. || 
|-id=848
| 136848 Kevanpooler ||  || Kevin Murphy (born 1949;  pen name: Kevan Pooler), a British historian and author who helped track the WWII past of the father of Maura Tombelli who co-discovered this minor planet. || 
|}

136901–137000 

|-id=922
| 136922 Brianbauer ||  || Brian A. Bauer (born 1982) is a senior systems engineer at the Johns Hopkins University Applied Physics Laboratory, who performed a leading role in fault protection and spacecraft autonomy for the New Horizons mission to Pluto. || 
|}

References 

136001-137000